MW magazine, which was earlier known as Man's World, is one of India's leading men's luxury lifestyle magazines. Founded in 2000, MW mission is to equip Indian men with information and advice to help them lead life to the fullest. The magazine covers fashion, style, grooming, fitness, cars, gizmos, watches, books, movies, music, wines, adventure, travel, relationship, politics, and culture.

History
Man's World was founded by Anuradha Mahindra and two leading Mumbai-based journalists, Radhakrishnan Nair, then the Executive Editor of Business India and Harsh Man Rai, the Creative Director. It was targeted at a generation of young men who were coming of age in the first decade of the economic boom unleashed by the economic liberalisation in India in early 1990s. 

The magazine's first issue featured Shah Rukh Khan, followed by the likes of Sachin Tendulkar, Amitabh Bachchan, and a string of achievers from the world of films, sports, and business. The magazine's name was shortened to MW in 2008.

MW and its digital edition (mansworldindia.com) have a strong presence in the luxury lifestyle segment of the Indian magazine market. MW works with a range of Indian and international luxury brands, including fashion houses like Gucci, Louis Vuitton, Tod's, Ermenegildo Zegna, etc., watch brands like Rolex, Omega, Hublot, Panerai, IWC, etc., and cars companies like Mercedes-Benz, Jaguar, BMW, Audi, etc.

Publisher
MW parent company, MW.Com India Pvt Ltd, changed hands in September 2021 when the controlling interest was bought over from Spenta Multimedia Pvt Ltd by Ventureland Asia Advisory Services, the venture capital arm of Creativeland Asia group owned by advertising veteran Sajan Raj Kurup. The name of the company was subsequently changed to Creativeland Publishing Pvt Ltd. 

Creativeland Publishing Pvt Ltd also publishes Rolling Stone India, the local Indian edition of the world's leading music and culture magazine. Radhakrishnan Nair is the publisher and Editor-in-chief of MW and Rolling Stone India edition. The company's contract publishing division publishes OnStage, the culture magazine owned by the National Centre for the Performing Arts (NCPA), Mumbai.

See also
 List of men's magazines

References

External links
 Official website
 Official website
 Official website

2000 establishments in Maharashtra
English-language magazines published in India
Men's magazines published in India
Lifestyle magazines
Magazines established in 2000
Men's fashion magazines
Mass media in Mumbai